Abu Sayeed Al Mahmood Swapon is a Bangladesh Awami League politician and the incumbent Member of Parliament from Joypurhat-2.

Early life
Swapon was born on 21 September 1969. He has B.A. and M.B.A. degrees.

Career
Swapon was elected to Parliament on 5 January 2014 from Joypurhat-2 as a Bangladesh Awami League candidate. From 23 to 26 April 2018, he was the acting General Secretary of Bangladesh Awami League after Obaidul Quader left for a  three-day trip to India.

References

Awami League politicians
Living people
1969 births
10th Jatiya Sangsad members
11th Jatiya Sangsad members